South Fork Stewarts Creek is a  long 1st order tributary to Stewarts Creek in Carroll County, Virginia.  This stream. along with North Fork Stewarts Creek, forms Stewarts Creek.

Course 
South Fork Stewarts Creek rises about 0.5 miles north of Rich Mountain in Carroll County and then flows generally east to join Stewarts Creek about 2 miles northwest of Lambsburg, Virginia.

Watershed 
South Fork Stewarts Creek drains  of area, receives about 54.4 in/year of precipitation, has a wetness index of 263.01, and is about 89% forested.

See also 
 List of Rivers of Virginia

References 

Rivers of Carroll County, Virginia
Rivers of Virginia